Iain James Martin (born 2 October 1971) is a Scottish political commentator, author and public speaker. He writes a weekly column for The Times and is co-founder, editor and publisher of Reaction - a news site providing analysis and opinion on politics, economics and culture. He is a former editor of The Scotsman and Scotland on Sunday, and an author of books on the financial crisis and the City of London.

Life and career
He was born in Paisley, and is a graduate of Glasgow University. Martin worked as a reporter for the Sunday Times Scotland (1993–97), as political editor of Scotland on Sunday (1997–2000), political editor of The Scotsman (2000–01), deputy editor of Scotland on Sunday (2001), editor of The Scotsman (2001–04), editor of Scotland on Sunday (2004–06), deputy editor of the Sunday Telegraph (2006), and head of comment for the Telegraph Media Group (2008–09). In 2016 he founded and is Editor of pro-market news website Reaction that focuses on commentary and analysis on politics, economics, and culture.

From 2009 to 2011 he was Deputy Editor of the Wall Street Journal Europe, for which he wrote a blog on politics. He moved to the Daily Mail newspaper in 2011 for a short time to write a weekly political column. He was a co-founder and editor of CapX, the site launched by the London-based Centre for Policy Studies in 2014. Since early 2017, he has written a weekly column in The Times.

Martin is wine critic for The Conservative. He has contributed to Standpoint magazine and the Financial News. His book Making it Happen: Fred Goodwin, RBS and the Men Who Blew Up the British Economy, on the financial crisis, was published in 2013 by Simon & Schuster. Crash, Bang, Wallop: the inside story of London's Big Bang and a financial revolution that changed the world, was published by Sceptre in September 2016. He is a member of the Advisory Board at The Alpine Fellowship. He lives in London.

He is a supporter of Brexit and believes that Nigel Farage should be given a peerage.

Works
Making it Happen: Fred Goodwin, RBS and the Men Who Blew Up the British Economy
Crash Bang Wallop: the inside story of London's Big Bang and a financial revolution that changed the world

Awards and honours
2013 Financial Times and Goldman Sachs Business Book of the Year Award, shortlisted for Making it Happen

References

1971 births
Living people
Alumni of the University of Glasgow
Place of birth missing (living people)
British male journalists
British political journalists
Scottish bloggers
Scottish journalists
Scottish newspaper editors
The Scotsman people
The Wall Street Journal people
Male bloggers